Peter D. Haas is an American diplomat who has served as the United States ambassador to Bangladesh since March 2022. Haas previously served as acting assistant secretary of state for economic and business affairs.

Education 
Haas earned a Bachelor of Arts degree in German and international studies from Illinois Wesleyan University in 1988 and a Master of Science in economics from the London School of Economics.

Career 
After joining the United States Foreign Service, Haas was first assigned to the U.S. embassy in Morocco as an economic officer. Haas also served as a desk officer for one year in the Foreign, Commonwealth and Development Office and was an economic officer in the Embassy of the United States, London. From 2011 to 2014, served as consul general of the United States, Mumbai. From 2014 to 2017, Haas worked for the United States mission to the OECD, including as acting permanent representative in 2017 and 2018. Haas then relocated to Washington, D.C., where he worked as acting deputy assistant secretary of state for trade policy and negotiations, deputy assistant secretary for trade policy and negotiations, and acting assistant secretary of state for economic and business affairs.

United States ambassador to Bangladesh
On July 9, 2021, President Joe Biden nominated Haas to be the next United States Ambassador to Bangladesh. The Senate Foreign Relations Committee held hearings on his nomination on October 20, 2021. His nomination was favorably reported by the committee on November 3, 2021. Haas was confirmed by the United States Senate on December 18, 2021, via voice vote. 

On March 15, 2022, he presented his credentials to the President of Bangladesh, Abdul Hamid.

Personal life
Haas speaks French and German.

References 

Living people
Year of birth missing (living people)
21st-century American diplomats
Alumni of the London School of Economics
Ambassadors of the United States to Bangladesh
American consuls
Illinois Wesleyan University alumni
United States Foreign Service personnel